Surgical Steel may refer to:
 Surgical stainless steel, stainless steel used in biomedical applications
 Surgical Steel (album), a 2013 album by extreme metal band Carcass